{{DISPLAYTITLE:C12H14ClNO2}}
The molecular formula C12H14ClNO2 (molar mass: 239.69 g/mol, exact mass: 239.0713 u) may refer to:

 Clomazone
 Hydroxynorketamine (HNK), or 6-hydroxynorketamine

Molecular formulas